A Million Little Pieces is a 2018 psychological drama film directed by Sam Taylor-Johnson, and written by Sam and Aaron Taylor-Johnson. Based on the 2003 semi-fictional book of the same name by James Frey, it follows Frey, a drug-addicted young man, who checks himself into a rehabilitation center to battle his addiction. Aaron Taylor-Johnson stars as Frey, and co-stars Billy Bob Thornton, Odessa Young, Giovanni Ribisi, Juliette Lewis, and Charlie Hunnam.

A Million Little Pieces premiered at the 2018 Toronto International Film Festival, and was released in the United States by Momentum Pictures on December 6, 2019, and internationally by Entertainment One. It received mixed reviews from critics.

Plot

Cast
Aaron Taylor-Johnson as James Frey
Billy Bob Thornton as Leonard
Odessa Young as Lilly
Giovanni Ribisi as John Everett
Juliette Lewis as Joanne
Charlie Hunnam as Bob Frey, Jr.
David Dastmalchian as Roy
Charles Parnell as Miles Davis
Andy Buckley as Dr. Stevens
Ryan Hurst as Hank
Dash Mihok as Lincoln
Eugene Byrd as Matty
Tom Amandes as Dr. Baker
Dominic Pace as Cecil
Drake Andrew as Ed
Deep Rai as Ticket Officer
Keith Barber as Old White Man

Production
Initial rights for a film adaptation were held by Warner Bros., which had shelved the project after it emerged the book was not a memoir as promoted, and the author James Frey fabricated elements of the story. In October 2017, Sam Taylor-Johnson was announced to be directing the film, with her husband Aaron Taylor-Johnson attached to star.

In January 2018, Billy Bob Thornton, Carla Juri, Charlie Hunnam and Giovanni Ribisi were added to the cast, with production beginning on January 25. David Dastmalchian and Juliette Lewis were cast a few days later. Odessa Young and Charles Parnell joined the cast in February, with Young replacing Juri.

Music
Atticus Ross, Leopold Ross and Claudia Sarne composed the film's score. Republic Records released the soundtrack with a score suite from the composers and songs by Otis Redding, Tom Waits, The Velvet Underground, Greta Van Fleet and others.

Release
A Million Little Pieces premiered at the Toronto International Film Festival in 2018. The film was released in select theaters and video-on-demand in the United States by Momentum Pictures on December 6, 2019, and internationally by Entertainment One (who also owns Momentum). Additionally the film was released on DVD in the United States by Universal Pictures Home Entertainment on January 6, 2020.

Reception

Critical response
The site's consensus reads, "While solidly cast and competently helmed, A Million Little Pieces amounts to little more than a well-intentioned but unpersuasive echo of a deeply problematic memoir." Metacritic gave the film a score of 45 out of 100 based on the opinions of 14 critics, indicating "mixed or average reviews".

References

External links
 

2018 films
Films directed by Sam Taylor-Wood
Films based on American novels
Films scored by Atticus Ross
Films set in 1993
Films set in the 1990s
Films about substance abuse
2010s English-language films